The AMT Skipper was a stainless steel copy of the .45 ACP Colt Combat Commander made by Arcadia Machine and Tool.

Statistics
SKIPPER
Chambering: .45 ACP., .40 S&W
Barrel Length: 4 inches.
Overall Length: 7.5 inches.
Weight: ? 
Magazine: 6-round single-column box magazine.
Sights: Adjustable for windage and elevation
Finish:
Furniture:Plastic
Features:  Adjustable Trigger & Sights
Production: 1978-79 (Very limited ) Manufactured in El Monte, CA.

COMBAT SKIPPER
Chambering: .45 ACP, .40 S&W
Barrel Length: 4.5 inches
Overall Length: 8 inches
Weight: 32 ounces
Magazine: 6-round single-stack magazine
Sights: Adjustable
Finish: Stainless Steel
Stocks: Plastic or Redwood
Production: 1978-79 ( Very Limited ) Manufactured in El Monte, CA.

See AMT Hardballer for additional info

External links
 AMT Skipper Owners Manual

AMT semi-automatic pistols
.45 ACP semi-automatic pistols
Semi-automatic pistols of the United States